Barad Parwa, also spelled Baradparwa, is a village in Jagdishpur block of Bhojpur district in Bihar, India. As of 2011, its population was 4,327, in 714 households.

References 

Villages in Bhojpur district, India